Cimpoi is the Romanian bagpipe.

Cimpoi has a single drone called bâzoi or bîzoi ("buzzer") and straight bore chanter called carabă ("whistle"). It is less strident than its Balkan relatives. 

The chanter often has five to eight finger holes, and is sometimes curved at the end. There are two types of cimpoi, one with a single drone and one with two. The bag (burduf) is made of a whole lamb or goat skin and, depending on the region, is made either with the fur in or out. It is sometimes covered with embroidered cloth. The bagpipe can be found in most of Romania apart from the central, northern and eastern parts of Transylvania, but at present (the early 21st century) is only played by a few elderly people. It is on the road to extinction, and there are only two makers left who know to make it in the traditional  way.

Its repertoire is mainly dance music, usually played accompanied by a folk orchestra or played solo to provide music for the traditional dance ensemble. The traditional repertoire of songs is very limited, consisting of about ten different melodies, each one paired with a different rhythm and dance.

References

External links

 Living traditions

Bagpipes
Romanian musical instruments
Moldovan musical instruments